The green-capped eremomela or greencap eremomela (Eremomela scotops) is a species of bird formerly placed in the "Old World warbler" assemblage, but now placed in the family Cisticolidae.

Range and habitat
It is found in Angola, Botswana, Burundi, Republic of the Congo, DRC, Gabon, Kenya, Malawi, Mozambique, Namibia, Rwanda, South Africa, Swaziland, Tanzania, Uganda, Zambia, and Zimbabwe. Its natural habitats are subtropical or tropical dry forests and dry savanna.

Races

There are five accepted races:
 E. s. congensis Reichenow, 1905 – Gabon to Angola and DRC
 E. s. pulchra (Bocage, 1878) – Angola, DRC, Zambia, western Malawi, Namibia and Botswana
 E. s. citriniceps (Reichenow, 1882) – Uganda, Kenya, Tanzania, Rwanda and Burundi
 E. s. kikuyuensis van Someren, 1931 – Kenya
 E. s. scotops Sundevall, 1850 – coastal Kenya, through eastern Malawi to northern South Africa

References

External links
 Green-capped eremomela - Species text in The Atlas of Southern African Birds.

green-capped eremomela
Birds of Southern Africa
green-capped eremomela
Taxonomy articles created by Polbot